Vladimirs Babičevs (born 22 April 1968) is a Latvian football manager and a former footballer. Currently, he is the manager of Latvia national under-19 football team.

Babičevs has played 51 matches for Latvia internationally.

Club playing career

His first club was 9. maijs where he played under Juris Docenko. In 1987 Babičevs joined Zvejnieks Liepāja for which he played 2 matches in the second Soviet league. In 1988, he switched to RAF Jelgava. With RAF he played for four seasons in different divisions of Soviet football, and in 1992 – in Latvian Virslīga. In 1992 RAF played a golden match against Skonto FC and lost 2:3. After the seasons Babičevs switched to the side of the victors – he joined Skonto.

With Skonto came the most successful years of Vladimirs' career – the club was by far the strongest in Latvia and Babičevs soon became one of the key players of Skonto. In 1994, he was the best goalscorer in the Latvian league with 14 goals and was selected the best forward in the league. In mid-nineties Babičevs' switched to midfield and in 1997 he was selected the best midfielder in the Latvian league. In 1997 Babičevs was the only Skonto player to score against FC Barcelona in the UEFA Champions League qualifiers.

In 1999, Babičevs got to play rather little – both because of competition and of his injuries. Before the 2000 season Babičevs together with several other Skonto players who the club didn't count with for the upcoming season left for  Policijas FK. In the middle of the season, Babičevs joined the only foreign club of his career – Torpedo-ZIL in Russia but he didn't play in any matches for the club. In 2001 Babičevs joined FK Rīga. In 2003, he switched to another new club – FK Jūrmala.

National team playing career

Babičevs made his national team debut on 2 June 1993 as Latvia lost 1:2 at home against Northern Ireland. On 15 November 1994 he scored his first goal for Latvia as in a rather poor match it beat Liechtenstein 1:0. In his international career Babičevs wasn't as much of a goalscorer as playing in different clubs – over 51 matches for Latvia he scored 4 goals. His last match for Latvia came in 1999 as it drew 2:2 away against Georgia.

Coaching career

In the middle of the 2006 season, Babičevs was signed as head coach of FK Jūrmala but his contract wasn't renewed at the end of the season as the club failed to finish in the 4th place in the Latvian league. On 23 January 2008, it was announced that Babičevs, who after leaving FK Jūrmala was director of JFK Olimps, was appointed an assistant coach for the club. From 2008 to 2011 he was the manager of FK Jūrmala-VV once again. In September 2011 he left the club as the results were poor. In March 2012 Babičevs was appointed as the manager of Latvia national under-19 football team.

Honours
National Team
 Baltic Cup
 1993

Club Team
 Champion of Latvia (7):
 1993–1999

 Latvian Cup Winner (3):
 1995, 1997, 1998

Individual
 Best Forward in Latvian League (1):
 1994

 Best Midfielder in Latvian League (1):
 1997

 Virsliga Top Scorer (1):
 1993

References

 

Latvian footballers
Association football midfielders
Latvian football managers
FK Liepājas Metalurgs players
Latvian Higher League players
Skonto FC players
FK Rīga players
FC Torpedo Moscow players
Latvian expatriate footballers
Expatriate footballers in Russia
Latvian expatriate sportspeople in Russia
Latvia international footballers
1968 births
Living people
FK Daugava (2003) managers
Soviet footballers
Latvian people of Russian descent
FC Moscow players